Alterdalens IF is a Swedish football club located in Altersbruk.

Background
Alterdalens IF currently plays in Division 4 Norrbotten Södra which is the sixth tier of Swedish football. They play their home matches at the Holma in Altersbruk.

The club is affiliated to Norrbottens Fotbollförbund.

Season to season

In their most successful period Alterdalens IF competed in the following divisions:

In recent seasons Alterdalens IF have competed in the following divisions:

Footnotes

External links
 Alterdalens IF – Official website

Sport in Norrbotten County
Football clubs in Norrbotten County